William Arceneaux (born August 19, 1941) is a Louisiana higher education official, an American professor, historian, writer, and Louisiana native. Arceneaux is President of the Council for the Development of French in Louisiana (CODOFIL), having been elected in January of 2011. 

Distinguished Visiting Lecturer in History at Tulane University in New Orleans (2007 to 2012) and adjunct Professor of History at Louisiana State University in Baton Rouge, Arceneaux is director and member of the board of trustees of the Foundation for Excellence in Louisiana Public Broadcasting (FELPB).

Career 

Arceneaux was President of the Louisiana Association of Independent Colleges and Universities (1987-2007), Louisiana's first Commissioner of Higher Education (1975-1987), Executive Director of the Louisiana Coordinating Council for Higher Education (1972-1975),  President of the State Higher Education Executive Officer’s Association (1979) (public sector), and President of the National Association of Independent Colleges and Universities State Executives (2002) (private sector).

Arceneaux is founder and chair of La Fondation Louisiane, a not-for-profit which provides scholarships for French language students.

Arceneaux has served as a member of the Board of Directors of the Europe/Louisiana Business Council, a member of the French/American Chamber of Commerce, Louisiana Chapter, and a member of the World Trade Center of New Orleans.

President Bill Clinton appointed Arceneaux to be Chair of the board of directors of SallieMae Corporation (1993-1997).

Arceneaux served on the board of Louisiana Public Broadcasting (LPB), the state wide affiliate of the Public Broadcasting Service (PBS), from 1989 to 2007.

As host of a weekly television show of classic French films called Cinéma Français which aired on LPB from 2009 to 2012, Arceneaux  introduced the films in French. English subtitles were provided along with study guides and discussions.

He serves as director and member of the board of trustees of the Foundation for Excellence in Louisiana Public Broadcasting (FELPB).

He was a Distinguished Visiting Lecturer in History at Tulane University in New Orleans (2007 to 2012), teaches as an Adjunct Professor of History at Louisiana State University in Baton Rouge, and is President of the Council for the Development of French in Louisiana (CODOFIL) (2011- ).

Honors 

Author 

Arceneaux is the author of two books:
 
  Published in French as Meurtre en Louisane: L'Affaire des Freres Blanc, Editions Atlantique, 2007.

Personal life 

Born in Scott, Louisiana on August 19, 1941. Graduated from the University of Louisiana at Lafayette with a B.A. in History in 1962.  Received his M.A. in 1965 from Louisiana State University in Baton Rouge. Ph.D. in History and Politics in 1969. 

Arceneaux spent most of 1967 in Venezuela and its politics became the central subject of his dissertation. This led to the founding of the Consortium for Service in Latin America (CSLA) in the 1980s which aimed to promote democracy training.

Married to Patricia Arceneaux, Bill lives in Baton Rouge, Louisiana. He has four children and five grandchildren.

Archives

The William Arceneaux Papers at the Hill Memorial Library at Louisiana State University cover his career.

References

External links
 La Fondation Louisiane
 Education leader retires  Arceneaux worked with state schools for 35 years.
 William Arceneaux Papers,  Louisiana and Lower Mississippi Valley Collections, Special Collections, Hill Memorial Library, Louisiana State University Libraries, Baton Rouge, Louisiana State University 
 Board of Regents Funds Chairs, Professorships, The William Arceneaux Professorship in Latin American History
 Foundation for Excellence in Louisiana Public Broadcasting 
 Consulate General of France in New Orleans, Visit of the Ambassador of France to the United States
 SallieMae Corporation
 Council for the Development of French in Louisiana

Historians of Louisiana
Tulane University faculty
Louisiana State University faculty
Officiers of the Ordre des Palmes Académiques
1941 births
Living people
Louisiana State University alumni
University of Louisiana at Lafayette alumni